Vietnam Airlines is the flag carrier of Vietnam, formed in 1956 as Vietnam Civil Aviation. It was established as a state enterprise in April 1989 before merging with around 20 other companies to form Vietnam Airlines Corporation (since renamed Vietnam Airlines Company Limited), with the airline as its centerpiece. From its hubs at Tan Son Nhat International Airport, Noi Bai International Airport, Da Nang International Airport and Cam Ranh International Airport, the airline flies to 69 scheduled and charter destinations in around 17 countries. The airline also has codeshare agreements with some 19 airlines, giving it a total comprehensive flight network spanning Asia, Europe, North America, Africa and Oceania.

Destinations
This is a list of destinations flown by Vietnam Airlines's passenger flights excluding codeshare flights. Flights are operated by Vietnam Airlines. Some domestic flights in Vietnam are operated by Vietnam Air Service Company (VASCO), a wholly owned subsidiary of Vietnam Airlines, for Vietnam Airlines.

References 

Vietnam Airlines
Vietnam Airlines
Vietnam Airlines